Gavatamak may refer to:
 Gavatamak, Khash
 Gavatamak (27°32′ N 61°20′ E), Khash